Jean-Louis Baugnies (born 17 June 1957) is a Belgian former cyclist. He competed in the individual event at the 1976 Summer Olympics.

References

External links
 

1957 births
Living people
Belgian male cyclists
Olympic cyclists of Belgium
Cyclists at the 1976 Summer Olympics
Cyclists from Hainaut (province)
Sportspeople from Mons